Ayoub El Yaghlane (born 10 March 1997) is a Belgian football free agent who most recently played as a defender for A.F.C. Tubize in the Belgian First Division B.

Career

Tubize
A product of the club's youth academy, El Yaghlane made his league debut for the club on 5 August 2017, coming on as a 68th minute substitute for Shean Garlito in a 3-1 defeat to Roeselare.

References

External links
Ayoub El Yaghlane at SofaScore

1997 births
Living people
Belgian footballers
A.F.C. Tubize players
Challenger Pro League players
Association football defenders